Sylejman Selimi (born September 25, 1970) is the former commander of the Kosovo Liberation Army, military organisation, who was convicted of war crimes for the torture and inhuman treatment of prisoners at the Likovac detention center during the Kosovo War. After the war, he served as Security Force of the Republic of Kosovo; he left this position in 2011 and became the ambassador to Albania.

Personal life 

Selimi was born on September 25, 1970 in the village of Açarevë, Drenica. At the time, it was a part of SAP Kosovo.  He finished primary education in his home town, attended his high school in Kline and finished his studies at the Faculty of Mining and Metallurgy in Kosovska Mitrovica.

Career

History
Prior to the Kosovo Security force, Selimi was commander of its predecessor, the Kosovo Protection Corps. On 19 December 2008, Selimi was appointed commander of the Kosovo Security force by Prime Minister Hashim Thaçi.

During the Insurgency in Kosovo and the subsequently intense Kosovo War, he was the commander of Kosovo Liberation Army, an ethnic-Albanian paramilitary organisation that sought the separation of Kosovo from the Federal Republic of Yugoslavia (FRY) during the 1990s and the eventual creation of a Greater Albania. Despite his noted contributions as the primary commander of the KLA, his lack of military experience inflicted heavy losses on the KLA's initial campaign. Due to these severe losses, he would later be replaced by the Croatian Army veteran, Agim Çeku. 

Selimi insisted:

War crimes
Selimi was convicted by Kosovo courts of torturing a civilian prisoner at a KLA detention camp in Likovc/Likovac. He received an eight-year prison sentence but later the court cut his sentence to seven years and was conditionally released in January 2019. Kosovo politicians celebrated his release, with President Hashim Thaci stating: "Kosovo is better and safer with the living hero Sylejman Selimi at liberty."

See also

Military of Kosovo

References

Living people
Kosovan diplomats
Ambassadors of Kosovo to Albania
1970 births
Kosovo Liberation Army soldiers
20th-century Albanian military personnel
20th-century Albanian politicians
Kosovo Albanians
People convicted of war crimes
People convicted of torture
Military personnel from Skenderaj